Donald J. Paulin (born October 29, 1933) was an American politician and businessman.

Born in Plymouth County, Iowa, Paulin graduated from Union Consolidated High School. He served in the United States Navy during the Korean War. He went to Westmar University for three years. Paulin was a kitchen cabinet retailer and president of a building materials company. Paulin served as mayor of Le Mars, Iowa. From 1983 to 1989, Paulin served in the Iowa House of Representatives and was a Republican.

Notes

1933 births
Living people
People from Le Mars, Iowa
Military personnel from Iowa
Westmar University alumni
Businesspeople from Iowa
Mayors of places in Iowa
Republican Party members of the Iowa House of Representatives